Teleoceras (Greek: "perfect" (teleos), "horn" (keratos)) is an extinct genus of grazing rhinoceros. It lived in North America during the Miocene and Pliocene epochs during the Hemingfordian to the end of Hemphillian from around 17.5 to 4.9 million years ago.

Description 

Teleoceras had much shorter legs than modern rhinos, and a barrel chest, making its build more like that of a hippopotamus than a modern rhino. Based on this description, Henry Fairfield Osborn suggested in 1898 that it was semi-aquatic and hippo-like in habits. This idea persisted for about a century, but has recently been discounted by isotopic evidence. Teleoceras is now thought to have been a terrestrial grazer on C3 plants. Teleoceras had a single small nasal horn.

Discovery 
Teleoceras is the most common fossil in the Ashfall Fossil Beds of Nebraska. In fact, its remains were so numerous and concentrated that the building housing the greatest concentration of Ashfall fossils is called the "Rhino Barn". Most of the skeletons are preserved in a nearly complete state. One extraordinary specimen includes the remains of a Teleoceras calf trying to suckle from its mother. This animal was featured in the episodes "Are Rhinos Dinos?" and "Dawn Of The Cats" of the Paleoworld series.

Extinction 
Teleoceras went extinct in North America alongside Aphelops at the end of the Hemphillian, most likely due to rapid climate cooling, increased seasonality and expansion of C4 grasses, as isotopic evidence suggests that the uptake of C4 plants was far less than that in contemporary horses. The Gray Fossil Site in northeast Tennessee, dated to 4.5-5 million years ago, hosts one of the latest-known populations of Teleoceras, Teleoceras aepysoma.

References

Bibliography 
 McKenna, Malcolm C., and Bell, Susan K. 1997. Classification of Mammals Above the Species Level. Columbia University Press, New York, 631 pp. 
 Prothero, Donald R. 2005. The Evolution of North American Rhinoceroses. Cambridge University Press, Cambridge, 218 pp.

External links 

Miocene rhinoceroses
Pliocene rhinoceroses
Miocene genus first appearances
Zanclean extinctions
Neogene mammals of North America
Barstovian
Clarendonian
Hemphillian
Fossil taxa described in 1894
Ringold Formation Miocene Fauna